Coleophora tacera is a moth of the family Coleophoridae. It is found in Uganda.

References

tacera
Moths of Africa
Moths described in 1965